The Colorado Rockies are a professional baseball team based in Denver, Colorado.  The club has been owned since formation by Charles and Richard Monfort. The Rockies were created as an expansion team for the 1993 season and rose to a postseason appearance after three seasons and the 1994–95 strike. Since then they have played in the postseason four more times: in 2007 (when they lost the World Series to the Red Sox), 2009, 2017, and 2018. In 2012, the Rockies won only 64 games - the fewest in their history over a full season. They are one of the two MLB franchises that has never won a division title, alongside their expansion cousin, the Miami Marlins. The Rockies are one of only two teams (the other being the Los Angeles Angels) to never lose 100 games in a season.

Table Key

Regular season results

Record by decade 
The following table describes the Rockies' MLB win–loss record by decade.

These statistics are from Baseball-Reference.com's Colorado Rockies History & Encyclopedia, and are current as of October 5, 2022.

Post-season record by year
The Rockies have made the postseason five times in their history, with their first being in 1995 and the most recent being in 2018.

References

 
Colorado Rockies
Seasons